Edinburgh Labour Students (ELS) is a society of the Edinburgh University Students' Association for University of Edinburgh students who support the Labour Party. The society is affiliated with Scottish Labour Students, the Scottish Labour Party, and the national counterparts Labour Students and the Labour Party. It is one of the largest student Labour societies in the United Kingdom and actively campaigns as part of the Labour Party.

ELS events include the invitation of prominent guest speakers from inside and outside the Labour Party. Past speakers include the former UK Prime Minister Gordon Brown along with members of the Shadow Cabinet Ian Murray and Douglas Alexander, all former members of the Club and University alumni, as well as ex-Chancellor of the Exchequer Alistair Darling, past leaders of the Scottish Labour Party Johann Lamont and Kezia Dugdale MSP, and Andrew Burns, former leader of Edinburgh City Council.

Edinburgh Labour Students run a varied schedule with regular meetings being used as forums for members to engage in topical discussions under the name 'Pint and Policy'. It also frequently encourages members to participate in campaigns with local Labour branches and in national events for the Labour Party and Labour Students. ELS' events are frequently praised, with the society recently being voted as the best for events by members of Labour Students.

Organisation 
An elected executive committee runs Edinburgh Labour Students, with by-elections taking place at the start of the academic year to elect liberation and first-year officers and elections for other committee positions taking place towards the end of the year, during the society's Annual General Meeting. As ELS is an Edinburgh University Students' Association society, it operates as such with its own constitution and is re-registered as a society each year in order to continue with this status.

Many members of Edinburgh Labour Students have gone on to hold roles in organisations affiliated to the society, including the former Campaigns & Membership Officer for Labour Students Emma Meehan, Chair of Steering George Melhuish and Chair of Scottish Labour Students Oliver Milne.

Liberation caucuses are key to the structure of ELS and have the right to autonomously campaign for the groups that they represent, meeting and organising separately. There are four liberation groups within ELS: LGBT+, Women's, Disabled Students, and Black Minority Ethnic, reflecting the structure used by Labour Students and Scottish Labour Students. Each liberation group is individually represented on the society committee by a liberation officer, who is elected at a caucus of self-defining members of that group.

Current Committee  

Chair: Solomon Cuthbertson 

Vice-Chair: Tom Creswell

Secretary: Fergal Francis 

Treasurer: Matthew Whitehead

Membership: Matthew Parker

Communications and Social Media: Tilly Dickson

Women's and Non-Binary Officer: Ellie McTimoney

Disability Officer: Oliver Beddow

Campaigning 
ELS engages with local constituency Labour Parties and affiliated organisations during political campaigns, playing a role in winning and holding the key seat Edinburgh South for Labour candidate Ian Murray in the 2010, 2015 and 2017 general elections. ELS members also campaigned extensively in the high-profile Aberdeen Donside by-election in 2013. Recently, ELS has participated in the pro-Union Better Together campaign in advance of the 2014 Scottish Independence Referendum.

The society has a strong history of its members standing for election in Student Union campaigns, with member Hugh Murdoch winning the Presidency of Edinburgh University Students' Association for the 2013/14 academic year. For the 2017/18 academic year, members Patrick Kilduff and Esther Dominy were elected to the positions of President and Vice President Welfare respectively. In 2018, ELS member and former Women's Officer, Georgina Harris, was elected as Vice President Community for the 2018/19 academic year. after endorsement and campaigning from the society.

Alumni 
 Gordon Brown MP and former Prime Minister (2007-2010)
 Robin Cook MP for Livingston and former Foreign Secretary (1997-2001)
 Tessa Jowell MP for Dulwich and West Norwood and former Secretary of State for Culture, Media, and Sport
 Ian Murray MP for Edinburgh South and Shadow Secretary of State for Scotland
 Douglas Alexander MP for Paisley and Renfrewshire South and former Shadow Foreign Secretary
 Iain Gray MSP for East Lothian and former leader of Scottish Labour, 2008-2011
 Catherine McKinnell MP for Newcastle upon Tyne North and former Shadow Exchequer Secretary

References

External links 
 Edinburgh Labour Students

Labour
Labour
Student wings of social democratic parties
Labour Students